The European Policy Centre (EPC) is a Brussels-based not-for-profit think tank on European Union affairs, founded in 1997.

Activities 

Under the guidance of Herman Van Rompuy, the EPC's Chief Executive is Fabian Zuleeg, a German economist. Its Director of Studies is Janis A. Emmanouilidis, a German-Greek political scientist and economist. The EPC's 33 analysts come from a range of backgrounds. They carry out research and analysis, organise expert meetings and events with the main stakeholders concerned with EU and global affairs and produce policy analysis online and in print. The EPC also works with 28 senior advisers and 14 academic fellows.

The EPC's policy work is organised under six main programmes:
Europe's Political Economy (led by Georg Riekeles, Associate Director)
Europe in the World (led by Ricardo Borges de Castro, Associate Director)
Social Europe and Well-Being (led by Elizabeth Kuiper, Associate Director)
European Politics and Institutions (led by Corina Stratulat, Senior Policy Analyst)
European Migration and Diversity (led by Marie de Somer, Senior Policy Analyst) 
Sustainable Prosperity for Europe (led by Annika Hedberg, Senior Policy Analyst) 
In addition, the EPC runs the Connecting Europe project (supported by the Mercator Foundation), which promotes sustainable exchanges between civil society initiatives throughout Europe and the policy community in Brussels.

Past speakers include Margaret Chan, former Director-General of the World Health Organization; Jacques Delors, former President of the European Commission; Mario Draghi, former Prime Minister of Italy and former President of the European Central Bank; Jean-Claude Juncker, former President of the European Commission; Christine Lagarde, President of the European Central Bank and former Director of the International Monetary Fund; Martin Schulz, former President of the European Parliament; Salil Shetty, former Secretary General of Amnesty International; Donald Tusk, President of the European People's Party Group and former President of the European Council; as well as numerous high-ranking ministers and officials from a wide range of EU and non-EU countries.

Funding 

The EPC's funding comes from a number of sources, including its strategic partners: the King Baudouin Foundation, based in Belgium and Stiftung Mercator, based in Germany, and Adessium Foundation, based in the Netherlands. It also comes from membership fees, and grants from the EU and other organisations. Details of these are published on its website.

Governance 

Herman Van Rompuy is President of the European Policy Centre and chairs its Strategic Council, which includes many prominent EU figures: Jean-Claude Juncker, Frederica Mogherini, Joaquin Almunia, Maria Joào Rodrigues, Lord Kerr of Kinlochard, Janez Potočnik, André Sapir, Wolfgang Schüssel, Rita Süssmuth, Marta Dassù, Catherine Day, Monica Frassoni, and Nathalie Tocci among many others.

The EPC's General Assembly and Governing Board are chaired by David O’Sullivan, Former EU Ambassador to the United States.

Former Presidents of the European Policy Centre include Peter Sutherland (1998-2011) and Philippe Maystadt (2011-2014). Former Chairs of the Governing Board include Hywel Ceri Jones, founder of the Erasmus Programme; António Vitorino, former European Commissioner; and Meglena Kuneva, former European Commissioner.

Membership 
The EPC has a membership of around 350 organisations, which spans the spectrum of stakeholders, from diplomatic embassies to companies, non-governmental organisations, and regional and local authorities. Members actively contribute to events, workshops, task forces and roundtables.

Tobacco companies 
In January 2010, research was published alleging that in the 1990s EPC helped tobacco companies, as well as other industry groups, lobby "to ensure that the EU framework for evaluating policy options emphasised business interests at the expense of public health".

References

External links

 
  EU Brexit chiefs cast doubt on May’s citizen offer
  It's cool to be pro-EU with popular French President Emmanuel Macron
  Cyprus rivals restart talks over reuniting island
  WHAT DOES THE EU WANT FROM BREXIT?

European integration think tanks
Political and economic research foundations
Political and economic think tanks based in the European Union
Non-profit organisations based in Belgium
Cross-European advocacy groups
Think tanks based in Belgium